Ugenya Constituency is an electoral constituency in Kenya, established for the 1963 elections. It is one of six constituencies of Siaya County.The first Professor from Ugenya was Prof. Henry Odera Oruka.

Members of Parliament

Wards

Villages 
 

Maugo

References 

Constituencies in Siaya County
Constituencies in Nyanza Province
1963 establishments in Kenya
Constituencies established in 1963